Nationality words link to articles with information on the nation's poetry or literature (for instance, Irish or France).

Events

825:
 Approximate date of completion of the Heliand

Works published

Births
Death years link to the corresponding "[year] in poetry" article. There are conflicting or unreliable sources for the birth years of many people born in this period; where sources conflict, the poet is listed again and the conflict is noted:

820:
 al-Buhturi (died 897), Arabian poet

825:
 Ariwara no Narihira (died 880), one of the Six best Waka poets
 Ono no Komachi (died 900), an early woman poet and also one of the Six best Waka poets

Deaths
Birth years link to the corresponding "[year] in poetry" article:

821:
 December 18 - Theodulf of Orléans (born between 750 and 760), in Angers

824:
 Han Yu (born 768), Chinese essayist and poet

826:
 Theodore the Studite (born 759), Byzantine monk and abbot

828:
 Abu al-Alahijah (born unknown), Islamic poet famous for writing homilies
 Abu-l-'Atahiya (born 748), Arab poet
 Al-Asma'i (born 740), Arab scholar and poet

See also

 Poetry
 9th century in poetry
 9th century in literature
 List of years in poetry

Other events:
 Other events of the 12th century
 Other events of the 13th century

9th century:
 9th century in poetry
 9th century in literature

Notes

Poetry by year
Poetry